West Gippsland or variation, may refer to:

West Gippsland, a primary sub-provincial geographic region of the Australian state of Victoria
Electoral district of Gippsland West of the Victorian Legislative Assembly for the state of Victoria in Australia
West Gippsland Hospital, Warragut, Victoria, Australia

See also

 
 
 West Gippsland Football League, several leagues
 West Gippsland Gazette, Warragut, Victoria, Australia; a newspaper
 West (disambiguation)
 Gippsland (disambiguation)